Upon his or her accession to the throne, the new Dutch monarch undergoes an inauguration ceremony as required by the constitution. The ceremony is taken as a joint session of the two houses of the States General, and is held at the Nieuwe Kerk in Amsterdam.

Background

In contrast with many other European monarchic customs, in the Netherlands new monarchs are not crowned. The Dutch crown and other regalia have never been physically bestowed. Article 32 of the Dutch constitution states that as soon as the monarch assumes the royal prerogative, he is to be sworn-in and invested in Amsterdam at a public joint session of the two houses of the States General. The monarch may not exercise the royal prerogative until reaching the age of 18.

Inauguration is strictly ceremonial as the successor to the throne instantly becomes the new monarch at the moment the former monarch dies or abdicates. The last Dutch monarch to rule until his death was William III in 1890. His successor was his daughter, Wilhelmina; however, she was not inaugurated until her coming of age in 1898. Her mother Emma of Waldeck and Pyrmont was regent from 1890 to 1898. Wilhelmina passed the throne to her daughter Juliana in 1948.

Abdication

Every monarch since Wilhelmina have so far chosen to abdicate their thrones after a certain time. The monarch, the heir to the throne, the royal family and the cabinet led by the prime minister meet in the Royal Palace of Amsterdam in the State Hall. The monarch signs the instrument of abdication, which is then signed by the heir, members of the royal family and members of government. As soon as the instrument is signed, the new monarch's accession is complete. The previous monarch then steps on the balcony of the palace, where the new monarch is introduced to the waiting public outside.

After the signature, the new monarch proceeds from the palace to the Nieuwe Kerk, where the States General of the Netherlands and the cabinet along with guests of honour have assembled.

Ceremony
The ceremony takes place as a joint session of the two houses of the States General (Verenigde Vergadering) and is presided over by the president of the joint session (i.e. the president of the senate). The ritual is held at the Nieuwe Kerk, in the capital city of Amsterdam. Regalia such as the crown, orb and sceptre are present but are never physically given to the monarch, nor are they worn by him or her, instead they are placed on cushions, on what is called a credence table. The royal regalia surround a copy of the Dutch constitution. Two other regalia–the sword of state and the standard of the kingdom bearing the coat of arms of the Netherlands–are carried by two senior military officers. During the ceremony, the monarch, wearing a ceremonial mantle, is seated on a chair of state on a raised dais opposite members of the States General. 

The ceremony consists of two parts

The monarch's master of ceremonies announces the arrival of the new monarch, who takes his seat on a chair of state opposite members of the States General and the regalia. The monarch gives an address before taking the oath to uphold the constitution and protect the people of the Kingdom. 

Following the monarch's oath, the monarch is paid homage to by the assemblage of people. The president of the joint session makes a declaration on behalf of those assembled and then swears or affirms this declaration.

Following this, the names of the members of the States General are called out, who then swear or affirm this declaration in turn. They either swear with the right hand raised and state, "Zo waarlijk helpe mij God Almachtig" (So truly help me, God almighty), or take a pledge with a simple "Dat beloof ik" (I promise that).

After every willing member has sworn or affirmed the declaration, the president of the joint session declares the ceremony to have been completed. This is followed by the senior King of Arms exclaiming that the monarch has been inaugurated and the president crying "long live the king!" to the response of three hurrahs from the public. The other heralds proceed outside the church to Dam Square where they also announce to the public outside that the monarch has been inaugurated and cry "long live the king!"

After the homage ceremony, the monarch and his retinue then exit the church and return to the palace. The ceremony is then followed by an official reception at the palace.

Medals 

Since the inauguration of Queen Wilhelmina in 1898, the Dutch government issues for each inauguration a limited number of commemoration medals (Inhuldigingsmedaille). The obverse shows the profile of the new monarch, while the reverse features the royal monogram, surrounded on the rim with the name of the monarch and the date of the inauguration. The ribbon's colour is mainly in orange, the colour of the royal house, and blue.

See also
Coronations in Europe
Inauguration of Willem-Alexander

References

External links
Wet beëdiging en inhuldiging van de Koning (Swearing-in and Investiture of the King act) wetten.overheid.nl Law governing the oaths to be taken at the ceremony
Account of the swearing-in and investiture ceremony of Willem-Alexander. wetten.overheid.nl
Abdication of Queen Wilhelmina and Inauguration of Queen Juliana , Polygoon newsreel, 1948. Netherlands Institute for Sound and Vision website.

Dutch
Dutch monarchy
Ceremonies in the Netherlands